The 2012–13 Southern Illinois Salukis men's basketball team represented Southern Illinois University Carbondale during the 2012–13 NCAA Division I men's basketball season. The Salukis, led by first year head coach Barry Hinson, played their home games at the SIU Arena and were members of the Missouri Valley Conference. They finished the season 14–17, 6–12 in MVC play to finish in last place. They lost in the first round of the Missouri Valley tournament to Missouri State.

Roster

Schedule

|-
!colspan=9| Exhibition

|-
!colspan=9| Regular season

|-
!colspan=9| Missouri Valley Conference tournament

References

Southern Illinois Salukis men's basketball seasons
Southern Illinois
Southern
Southern